Sir Duncan Brian Walter Ouseley (born 24 February 1950), styled The Hon. Mr Justice Ouseley, is a recently retired High Court judge in England and Wales, Queen's Bench Division. He is notable for involvement in many legal cases reported in the British press.

Ouseley was educated at Trinity School of John Whitgift, Croydon, Fitzwilliam College, Cambridge (MA) and University College London (LLM).

His judgments have included rejecting appeals by suspected international terrorists against indefinite detention; a view overturned in 2004, when the House of Lords ruled that it violates the Human Rights Act and the European Convention on Human Rights.

In 1992, as a Queen's Counsel, Ouseley represented the Chief Adjudication Officer for Social Security Administration. From 2002 to 2005 he was President of the Immigration Appeal Tribunal.

In 2002, in the case Theakston v Mirror Group Newspapers Ltd, the television presenter Jamie Theakston sought an injunction against The Sunday People claiming publication of details of his visit to a brothel infringed his right to privacy under Article 8 of the European Convention on Human Rights. Refusing to impose the injunction, Ouseley ruled "It is not inherent in the nature of a brothel that all or anything that transpires within is confidential.

In February 2012, an atheist councillor and the National Secular Society took Bideford Town Council to the English High Court to challenge the saying of prayers at council meetings. Ouseley ruled that the town council was acting unlawfully, citing the Local Government Act 1972, and ordered that prayers should stop. This decision affects all councils in England and Wales. The ruling was welcomed by the British Humanist Association, but was criticised by Christians, religious groups, and bishops, who felt Christianity was being "marginalised", or was "under attack" in the UK.

In October 2015, Transport for London took Uber, the Licensed Taxi Drivers Association and the Licensed Private Car Hire Association to the High Court of Justice to receive clarification about whether Uber fell within section 11 of the Private
Hire Vehicles (London) Act 1998 and was therefore unlawful. Ouseley ruled that "A taximeter, for the purposes of Section 11 of the Private Hire Vehicles (London) Act 1998, does not include a device that receives GPS signals in the course of a journey, and forwards GPS data to a server located outside of the vehicle, which server calculates a fare that is partially or wholly determined by reference to distance travelled and time taken, and sends the fare information back to the device." Thereby ruling that Uber did not fall foul of the Private Hire Vehicles (London) Act 1998 and was therefore lawful.

Controversial cases

Dr Bawa Garba
Ouseley is the judge in the trial of Dr. Bawa Garba in 2017. Despite considerable failings of the hospital on the day Jack Adcock died, such as short staffing and computer system malfunction, Dr. Bawa Garba was charged with manslaughter by gross negligence and was erased from the medical register. Dr. Bawa Garba successfully appealed that decision in the Court of Appeal, who upheld her appeal on 13 August 2019.

Decided cases
HJ Banks & Co Ltd v Secretary of State for Housing and Local Government [2018] EWHC 3141 (Admin) overturning the refusal to allow a coal mine on the ground that not enough justifications were given for how renewable energy could replace coal 
R (Wilson) v PM [2018] EWHC 3520 (Admin) finding that Russian interference in the Brexit poll was irrelevant
Transport for London v Uber London Ltd [2015] EWHC 2918 (Admin) finding Uber was not in breach of private hire vehicle rules in Private Hire Vehicles (London) Act 1998 section 11

References

Living people
People educated at Trinity School of John Whitgift
Alumni of Fitzwilliam College, Cambridge
21st-century English judges
Queen's Bench Division judges
Place of birth missing (living people)
Knights Bachelor
1950 births